Somethin' 'Bout You Baby I Like is the thirty-sixth album by American singer/guitarist Glen Campbell, released in 1980.

The title track, first recorded by Tom Jones in 1974, became a hit on three U.S. charts for Campbell in June 1980, recorded as a duet with Rita Coolidge.

Track listing
Side 1:
 "Somethin' 'Bout You Baby I Like" (Richard Supa) – 2:45 - duet with Rita Coolidge
 "Through My Eyes" (T. J. Kuenster) – 3:42
 "That Kind" (Neil Diamond, Carole Bayer Sager) – 3:13
 "Part Time Love" (David Gates) – 2:33
 "Hollywood Smiles" (Larry Weiss) – 3:17
   
Side 2:
 "If This Is Love" (Kerry Chater, Robbie Patton) – 4:01
 "Hooked On Love" (Ian Gomm) – 2:06
 "Show Me You Love Me" (Micheal Smotherman) – 3:08 - duet with Rita Coolidge
 "Late Night Confession" (Gary Portnoy, Jay Davidson) – 3:35
 "It Goes Like It Goes" (David Shire, Norman Gimbel) – 3:40

Personnel
Glen Campbell – vocals, acoustic and electric guitars, backing vocals
Steve Turner – drums
Neil Stubenhaus – bass guitar
Dean Parks – acoustic guitars and electric guitars
Jai Winding – keyboards, clavinet, organ, electric piano
Jeff Baxter – electric guitars; vocoder on "That Kind"; pedal steel guitar on "Show Me You Love Me"; organ on "Hooked On Love"
T.J. Kuenster – acoustic piano on "Show Me You Love Me" and "It Goes Like It Goes"
Catherine Gotthoffer – harp on "Through My Eyes", "Part Time Love" and "If This Is Love"
Alan Estes - percussion on "Hollywood Smiles"
Nick DeCaro - vocoder on "If This Is Love"
Tanya Tucker - backing vocals on "Hollywood Smiles" and "If This Is Love"
Tom Saviano, Dick Hyde, David Boruff, Steve Madaio, Pete Christlieb, Warren Luening, Vincent DeRosa, Art Maebe, Lew McCreary, Lloyd Ulyate - horns
Tom Saviano, Nick DeCaro, Lee Holdridge - arrangements
Harry Bluestone, Sid Sharp - concertmaster

Production
Gary Klein - producer
Charles Koppelman - executive producer
Frank DeCaro - musical contractor
John Arrias - recording, mixing
Sheridan Eldridge - recording
Roy Kohara - art direction
Jim McCrary - photography

Charts
Singles – Billboard (United States)

References

Glen Campbell albums
1980 albums
albums arranged by Lee Holdridge
Albums produced by Gary Klein (producer)
Capitol Records albums
Albums recorded at Capitol Studios